Route 370 is a short provincial highway located in the Laurentides region of Quebec. The 11-kilometer highway which starts at the junctions of Autoroute 15 and Route 117 links the towns of Sainte-Adele and Esterel, two major touristic destinations in the region.

Towns located along Route 370
 Sainte-Adèle
 Sainte-Marguerite-du-Lac-Masson
 Estérel

Major intersections

See also
 List of Quebec provincial highways

References

Sources
 Official Map of Transports Quebec 
 Route 370 on Google Maps

370